Willowville may refer to:

 Willowville, Ohio